British Forces Brunei (BFB) is the name given to the British Armed Forces presence in Brunei. Since the handover ceremony of Hong Kong in 1997, the garrison in Brunei is one of the remaining British military bases in the Far East along with Singapore (and one of six East of Suez, along with Diego Garcia, HMS Juffair, UKJLSB, Sembawang Base in Singapore and the Omani-British Joint Training Area.)

History

The BFB garrison came about in 1963, when British troops were moved there from Singapore to quell a revolt against Sultan Omar Ali Saifuddien III in December 1962.

From there, British forces have been involved in several conflicts, including helping to quell the Brunei Revolt of 1962 and the Indonesia–Malaysia confrontation. Since Brunei's independence in 1984, forces have been stationed there at the request of the current Sultan, in a renewable agreement lasting five years at a time. The forces stationed in Brunei are available to assist the Sultan, but are also available for deployment overseas with other elements of the British Armed Forces if needed. As recompense, the Sultan pays to help support the British presence.

Structure
BFB is located at Seria and is centred on a light infantry battalion, which will be one of the two battalions of the Royal Gurkha Rifles. The battalion stationed in Brunei operates as the British Army's acclimatised Far East reserve, and is available for overseas deployment to the Far East and beyond—the Brunei-based battalion has been deployed to Afghanistan as part of Operation Herrick on several occasions, as well as to East Timor.

In addition, Brunei serves as one of the British Army's major training areas, specialising in jungle warfare, with the Jungle Warfare Training School (also known as Training Team Brunei) running the Jungle Warfare Advisor's Course.
Stationed units
HQ Brunei Garrison
Resident infantry battalion (rotated every three years)
2nd Battalion, Royal Gurkha Rifles
667 Squadron, Army Air Corps
Jungle Warfare Division, Infantry Battle School
Brunei Police Unit
Brunei Signal Troop

Off-duty life
The British Forces Broadcasting Service broadcasts to the garrison, carrying programmes from both BFBS Radio 1 and BFBS Radio Gurkha. The Hornbill School, operated by Service Children's Education, is a primary school for children of services personnel.

See also
 Camp Gonsalves – United States Marine Corps equivalent jungle warfare training site.
 Combat Training Centre - Jungle Training Wing the Australian jungle warfare center.
 List of British Army installations

Notes

External links
The British Army in Brunei

Brunei
Brunei–United Kingdom military relations
Military of Brunei
Joint commands of the United Kingdom
Military installations of the United Kingdom in other countries
Brunei and the Commonwealth of Nations
United Kingdom and the Commonwealth of Nations
British Army Garrisons